Don Det, is an island in the Mekong River in the Si Phan Don ("Four Thousand Islands") archipelago in Champasak Province of southern Laos.

History
The Don Det–Don Khon railway was a -long narrow-gauge portage railway on the islands of Don Det and Don Khon, opened in 1893 to transport vessels, freight, and passengers along the Mekong River, and closed since the 1940s.

Geography
Don Det is linked to its twin island Don Khon by a bridge.

There is a Buddhist temple and two primary schools on the northern part of the island.

Climate
Don Det features a tropical wet and dry climate. While the city is generally very warm throughout the year, it is noticeably cooler during December and January. Don Det also experiences wet and dry seasons, with the wet season from April until October, and the dry season during the remaining five months. Temperatures range from 15°C to 38°C.

Tourism
The Khone Phapheng Falls, a succession of impassable rapids that gave rise to the construction of the railway, are among the main features accessible from Don Det.
Freshwater Irrawaddy dolphins (pakha), an endangered species, are now extinct.

Wildlife
Irrawaddy dolphins, water buffaloes (Bubalus bubalis), common House Geckos (Hemidactylus frenatus), bronze grass skink (Eutropis macularia), and bioluminescent beetles can be seen in Don Det.

Gallery

References

External links

Populated places in Champasak Province
Populated places on the Mekong River